Carole Eastman (February 19, 1934 – February 13, 2004) was an American actress and screenwriter. Among her credits are screenplays for Monte Hellman's The Shooting (1967), Bob Rafelson's Five Easy Pieces (1970) (for which she was nominated for an Academy Award along with co-writer Rafelson), and Mike Nichols’s The Fortune (1975).  She occasionally used the pseudonyms "Adrien Joyce" and "A.L. Appling".

Filmography
The Shooting (1967)
Run for Your Life (1968) (TV) (Episodes 42 & 80)
Model Shop (1969) 
Five Easy Pieces (1970)
Puzzle of a Downfall Child (1970)
The Fortune (1975)
Man Trouble (1992) 
Running Mates (1992) (TV)

References

External links 

1934 births
2004 deaths
American women screenwriters
20th-century American women writers
20th-century American screenwriters
People from Glendale, California
Writers from California
21st-century American women